This is the discography of Belgian DJ Lost Frequencies.

Studio albums

Extended plays

Singles

As lead artist

As featured artist

Promotional singles

Remixes

Notes

References

Electronic music discographies